Alfred was launched at Chittagong in 1818 and in 1820 her owners transferred her registry to Great Britain. She then traded around India and between Britain and India under a license from the EIC. Between 1827 and 1828 made a voyage to China for the British East India Company (EIC) as an "extra ship", i.e., under charter. In 1845 she was condemned but new owners restored her and named her Deutschland. She was last listed in 1857.

Career
Alfred first appears in Lloyd's Register in 1820. Her master is Wilkerson, her owner is Alexander, and her trade is  London—India.

What the above table, drawn from various issues of Lloyd's Register, hides is that between 1827 and 1828 she made a voyage to China under charter to the EIC. At the time her principal managing owners were Fraser, Living & Co. Captain John Pearson sailed from the Downs on 16 April 1827 and arrived at Whampoa Anchorage on 10 August. Homeward bound, she left Whampoa on 10 October, reached Saint Helena on 28 December, and arrived at Blackwall on 20 February 1828. The EIC had chartered her for £13 17s 6d per ton.
 
After her sale to Flint, she was converted to a barque.

On 6 May 1845, Alfred was condemned at Valparaiso as unseaworthy. However, Roepingh, Hamburg purchased and refitted her, renaming her Deutschland.

Fate
No longer listed after 1857.

Citations

References
 
 
 

1818 ships
British ships built in India
Ships of the British East India Company
Age of Sail merchant ships
Merchant ships of the United Kingdom